Mehmud Abdukerem (born 14 April 1993) is a Chinese footballer currently playing as a defender for Xinjiang Tianshan Leopard.

Career statistics

Club
.

References

1993 births
Living people
People from Kashgar
Footballers from Xinjiang
Chinese footballers
Association football defenders
China League One players
Xinjiang Tianshan Leopard F.C. players